The battle of Khorramshahr was a major engagement between Iraq and Iran during the Iran–Iraq War. The battle took place from 22 September to 10 November 1980. Widely known for its brutality and violent conditions, the city of Khorramshahr came to be referred to by the Iranians as Khuninshahr.

The battle lasted for 34 days, and saw an immense investment of Iraqi forces, far beyond what Iraqi war plans had envisaged. In turn, this battle enabled Iranian forces to stabilize the frontlines at Dezful, Ahvaz, and Susangerd, and move reinforcements to Khuzestan. At the time of the battle, Khorramshahr was mainly being defended by the heavily outnumbered Navy Commandos (Takavaran), some units of the 92nd Armoured Division, the Pasdaran, and civilian militia.

Khorramshahr was eventually recaptured by the Iranians during Operation Beit ol-Moqaddas in 1982, which marked the war's turning point in Iran's favour. Notably, 25% of the fighting force in the city were women as they refused to evacuate and sought to defend it.

Prelude
Following the Islamic Revolution in 1979, elements of Arab anti-government groups began plotting in the Khuzestan province in an effort to have Khuzestan secede from Iran. Between October and September 1980, the city saw several incidents of bombings and terrorism amongst the population. This period also saw frequent border violations between Iran and Iraq. In fact, these violations and episodes of violence became so frequent, some locals believed the first days of the war were the result of worsening clashes.

Finally, on September 17, Iraqi president Saddam Hussein declared the 1975 Algiers Agreement null and void, thus setting the countdown to war, which would begin a few days later.

In the defense of Khorramshahr, the Iranians prepared a series of dikes on the city outskirts. The first dike held regular soldiers and the second dike held tanks, artillery, and anti-tank weapons. The Dej garrison of the Iranian Army was responsible for much of the city’s outer defences with a single company of British-made Chieftain tanks at their disposal.

First phase

In the afternoon of September 22, Iraq launched its first phase of the invasion through a series of air strikes throughout the country. The customs office of Khorramshahr was among the first targets. Roughly 150 artillery batteries based around the Iraqi town of Tannumah fired the opening salvo. By evening, as the air raids died down, the city lay shrouded in fire and smoke. Basic services such as water and electricity were cut off and tens of thousands of people were killed along the western edge of the city, particularly in the Taleqani district, the rail-road station, and Mowlawi neighborhood.

Overnight, 500 Iraqi tanks moved in towards the Khorramshahr-Ahvaz road. Outposts surrounding the city fell, but Iranian defenders managed to hold back several Iraqi tanks using recoilless rifles. While most of these outposts fell to Iraqi mechanized divisions by early morning, September 23, they gave the Iranians enough time to prepare defences in and around the city.

The Iraqis then proceeded to surround Khorramshahr in a crescent-like formation. The third and fourth day of the invasion consisted of Iraqi forces trying to capture and hold the Khorramshahr-Ahvaz road. However, the Iraqis faced a difficult enemy by the Iranian forces returning incessantly with rocket-propelled grenades and 106-millimeter guns. A large part of the Dej garrison was wiped out, but the battle contributed to the slow advance of the Iraqi forces.

According to Cdr. Hooshang Samadi, commander of the Iranian Navy's Takavar Battalion, the main problems during the initial days of the battle was the lack of unity in command, as well as lack of heavy weapons, ammunition, and ambulances.

By September 30, however, the Iraqis had cleared most of the dikes and captured the area around the city, cutting it off from both Abadan and the rest of the Khuzestan province. With this in their hands, the Iraqis stood at the gates of Khorramshahr. Up until that point, the Iranian forces consisted of the Dej Battalion soldiers, 700 Takavar Marines, 30 Pasdars and Basijis, and 185 personnel from Gendarmerie and Shahrbani. After September 30, 260 Officers' School cadets, 175 personnel from Havanirooz, 33 officers from other Army units, 25 Basijis from Tehran and 300 local people joined the fight. Pasdaran forces reportedly had to rely on G3s and M1 Garands, and the Gendarmerie's battalion was merely equipped with Brno vz. 24 bolt-action rifles.

At sunrise, a unit of sixty commandos became the first of thousands of Iraqi forces to enter Khorramshahr via the southernmost port. This force was repulsed by a number of Pasdaran defenders, eight of whom were killed. Even with this news, tanks and mechanized units of the Iraqi 3rd Armoured Division moved into the city later that day. One force moved in to occupy a slaughterhouse, another to take the railway station, and another to secure the Dej barracks in the Taleqani district. The Pasdaran awaited the Iraqis at these positions with light weapons, rocket propelled grenades, and Molotov cocktails. It was in the suburbs that the Iraqi attack stalled when they encountered Chieftain tanks. Local counterattacks by Pasdaran anti-tank teams turned back the Iraqi forces at several points. Later reports indicated in-fighting amongst Iraqi units, a sign of weakness for poorly trained conscripts. The sheer weight of the Iraqi tank force was effective against the anti-tank teams, but when Iranian armour was encountered, it stopped attacks cold. After fierce fighting, the Iraqis briefly occupied the slaughterhouse and the railway station, but were pushed back to previous positions on the outskirts of the city.

Second phase

In response to the first assault's heavy losses, the Iraqis recuperated on the outskirts of the city until their next attack on October 11. During that time, the Iraqis mercilessly shelled the city, under orders from Iraqi Colonel Ahmad Zeidan. The high command decided to send in additional commando units with armour providing backup.

On October 14, the Iraqis moved in once again, using the element of night attacks to advance troops, gain surprise, and place observation points in tall buildings. The Iranians would often use snipers at night, which slowed down the invading Iraqis. Due to repeated assaults of combined arms, the Iraqis managed to overtake the Iranian Chieftain tanks and Pasdaran units.

According to Hooshang Samadi, heavy Iraqi shelling occurred on 16 October, using BM-21s, Katyushas, 130 mm artillery and airstrikes.

With these tactics, the Iraqis achieved significant results with Special Forces and Commando units seizing the port and traffic police station. Armoured brigades seized the Dej barracks in the Taleqani district and gained control of the main highway leading to the Grand Mosque. Battles were often fought house-to-house, floor-to-floor, and room-to-room. Reports indicate that Iraqis would at times encounter Pasdaran and Basij units armed with anything from assault rifles to sticks and knives.

Third phase

The city centre in their sights by October 21, the Iraqis turned their objectives to seizing both the Government building and the bridge linking Khorramshahr to Abadan. In all, five battalions of infantry and Special Forces were to take part in seizing these objectives. The main initiative of the attack was to take these targets within forty-eight hours and effectively take control of Khorramshahr.

The forces dispatched in the early hours of October 24. Iranian forces fought viciously against the Iraqi invaders, but the bridge fell within five hours. Towards the Government building, Iraqi armour encountered heavy resistance in the surrounding streets and neighbourhoods. As the fighting moved closer toward the city center, Iranian Chieftains were reduced to a supporting role, since the tanks could not fire as effectively through the tight and narrow streets. Dwindling ammunition, repeated Iraqi assaults, and exhaustion also began to wear down the Iranian defenders. By the late afternoon of the 24th, the Iraqis briefly seized the Government building. They were surrounded and repulsed by Iranian forces, but attacked again during the night, effectively seizing control of the building.

All that remained was the Grand Mosque and a handful of Pasdaran and youth volunteers, and the remaining Takavar marines, who were 300 overall. Army and Pasdaran commanders began to issue final evacuation orders with warnings of impending airstrikes by the Iranian Air Force. Over the night of October 25 and 26, the remainder of the Iranian defenders proceeded to evacuate towards the Karun River. Iraqi artillery shelled them in their flight, but some youth volunteers stayed behind to cover their retreat. By early morning of November 10, the city of Khorramshahr was effectively under Iraqi control.

Aftermath
With the exception of some Iraqi military, the city practically became a ghost town. Immediately after the start of the occupation, soldiers looted goods from the Iranian ports, and had them transferred to Basra. According to other claims, soldiers raped several Iranian women in the city as well. Iraqi soldiers also reportedly set up iron beams and upright cars in the event of an airborne assault by Iranian paratroopers.

Due to both the strategically high loss of men and the harsh weather following the battle, the Iraqis were unable to conduct any further offensives against Iran. The city remained in Iraqi hands until April 1982, when the Iranians launched Operation Beit ol-Moqaddas to recapture the Khuzestan province.

Khorramshahr had been completely devastated by Saddam Hussein's forces, with very few buildings left intact. Other major urban centres such as Abadan and Ahvaz were also left in ruins, though nowhere nearly as bad as Khorramshahr. Even decades after the war's end, some buildings remain in ruins as testimony to those who fought. Graffiti remains on the walls in spots, reading in Arabic "We come to Stay Forever." The city of Khorramshahr was one of the primary and most important front lines of the war and has thus achieved mythic status amongst the Iranian population.

Order of battle

Iraq
 3rd Armoured Division
 35th Armoured Brigade
 43rd Armoured Brigade
 14th Mechanized Brigade
 31st Special Forces Brigade
 2nd Battalion
 3rd Battalion
 33rd Special Forces Brigade
 8th Battalion
 9th Battalion
 66th Special Forces Brigade
 5th Mechanized Division
 26th Armoured Brigade
 al-Hassan Tank Battalion (attached to 33rd Special Forces Brigade)
 15th Armoured Brigade
 3rd Mechanized Battalion (the main body of which was attacking towards Ahwaz on flank of the 3rd AD)
 49th Infantry Brigade
 1st Battalion
 2nd Infantry Division
 4th Commando Battalion
 2nd Infantry Brigade
 2nd Battalion
 3rd Battalion
 429th Infantry Brigade
 1st Battalion
 Jeish-Al-Shabi paramilitaries
 Two battalions
 23rd Infantry Brigade
 1st Battalion
 Republican Guard
 3rd Republican Guards Special Forces Battalion

Source:

Iran

 Organized forces
(Commanded by President Abolhassan Banisadr)
  Islamic Republic of Iran Army
  Ground Forces
 92nd Armored Division of Khuzestan
 165th Mechanized Battalion
 151st Fortress Battalion
 77th Infantry Division of Khurasan
 2nd Infantry Brigade of Quchan (not engaged)
  Navy:
 1st Takavar Marine Battalion at Khorramshahr Naval Base  Commanded by Cdr. Hooshang Samadi
  Islamic Republic of Iran Gendarmerie:
 Coastal Gendarmerie Battalion of Khosroabad
  Islamic Revolutionary Guard Corps:
 Revolutionary Guards form Shushtar, Abadan, Mahshahr, Omidiyeh and Isfahan  Commanded by Mohammad Jahanara
  Shahrbani:
 Shahrbani of Khorramshahr  Commanded by Mohammad Reza Abbasi (Governor of Khorramshahr)

 Volunteer forces
 Islamic Republic of Iran Army Aviation personnel
 Officers' School cadets
 Organization of Iranian People's Fedaian
 People's Mojahedin Organization of Iran
 Basijis
 Dismissed personnel of the former Imperial Iranian Army
 Local Arab tribes
 Moavedin
 People from across Iran

Historic figures
Pasdaran commander, Mohammad Jahanara, was one of the last few fighters to leave Khorramshahr when it fell to the Iraqis. He would go on to fight in the siege of Abadan and lead Iranian forces in the offensive to liberate Khorramshahr. He died  before the city was liberated on May 24. A notable song, "Mammad Naboodi", was later sung in commemoration.

Mohammed Hossein Fahmideh, was a teenager who voluntarily went to the front line and died in a successful attempt to stop an Iraqi convoy of tanks in a narrow path, losing his own life in the process. Iran's Leader Ayatollah Khomeini called him "our leader" in a speech, and he later became a war hero of Iran. He was posthumously awarded the 1st grade Fath Medal of Honor, becoming the first recipient.

It was at this battle that four Iranian women were detained by Iraqi forces, one on the front lines and the other three in the city proper. The four women were the only female Iranian prisoners of war during the Iran–Iraq War.

Bibliography
 Khomeini's Forgotten Sons: Child Victims of Saddam's Iraq, by Ian Brown, Grey Seal Books, 1990
 Essential Histories: The Iran–Iraq War, 1980–1988, by Efraim Karsh, Osprey Publishing, 2002
 Ghost Town On The Gulf, Time, November 24, 1980
 A Holy War's Troublesome Fallout, by William E. Smith, Time, June 7, 1982
 Twarikh Guru Khalsa by 
 Living in Hell: A True Odyssey of a Woman's Struggle in Islamic Iran Against Personal and Political Forces, by Ghazal Omid, Hardcopy, Park Avenue Publishers, Oklahoma, July 30, 2005
 The Road to Khorramshahr, by William Drozdiak, Time, October 13, 1980
 The Longest War, Dilip Hiro, Routledge, Chapman, & Hall, 1991

See also
 23 People
 Liberation of Khorramshahr
 Women in the Iran-Iraq War

References

External links
 
 Official Site of Holy Defense - Khorramshahr
 Persian Gulf War: Iraqi Invasion of Iran, September 1980
  Foreign Military Studies Office: MOUT in Iraq: Population Dependent?
  Armor Evens the Odds in Two Urban Battles A Tale of Two Cities – Hue and Khorramshahr
 Photos of Mohammed Jahanara
 Mohammed Hossein Fahmideh clip
 The Only Iranian Woman Captured at the Front
 http://www.reed.edu/reed_magazine/winter2007/features/iran/3.html
 https://web.archive.org/web/20110707154922/http://www.arashabdi.com/skabelon5khabarhayerooz_action.asp?id=576
 https://web.archive.org/web/20150111194223/http://forums.iransportspress.com/archive/index.php/t-16453-p-2.html
 http://www.payvand.com/news/09/may/1248.html

Khorramshahr
History of Khuzestan Province
1980 in Iran
Khorramshahr
Khorramshahr
Khorramshahr
Khorramshahr